Henry Albert Cheeseman (20 December 1875 – 18 September 1956) was an Australian rules footballer who played with Geelong in the Victorian Football League (VFL).

Notes

External links 

1875 births
1956 deaths
Australian rules footballers from Victoria (Australia)
Geelong Football Club players
Ararat Football Club players